The Secretary for Economic Services ( and later ) was a minister position in the Government of Hong Kong, which is responsible for economic development in Hong Kong. The position was renamed to the Secretary for Economic Development and Labour after nearly thirty years. The new position headed the Economic Development and Labour Bureau and was created together with the introduction of Principal Officials Accountability System on 1 July 2002, by merging the positions with the labour portfolio of Secretary for Education and Manpower. After POAS was introduced all secretaries are members of the Executive Council.  

The position was abolished in 2007 when the Economic Development and Labour Bureau was abolished and its functions transferred to the Commerce and Economic Development Bureau, the Transport and Housing Bureau, and the Labour and Welfare Bureau.

List of office holders

Secretaries for Economic Services, 1973–1997

Secretaries for Economic Services, 1997–2002

Secretaries for Economic Development and Labour, 2002–2007

 Economic and labour affairs were handled by, respectively, Secretary for Commerce and Economic Development and Secretary for Labour and Welfare after 2007.

References 

Economic Services
Hong Kong